Bogdanovich is a town in Sverdlovsk Oblast, Russia, located on the Kunara River (right tributary of the Pyshma),  east of Yekaterinburg. Population:

History
It was founded in 1883–1885 as a settlement around the Bogdanovich railway station, which opened in 1885. Town status was granted in 1947.

Sports
The bandy team Fakel plays in the 2nd highest division of the Russian Bandy League. Their home arena has a capacity of 3,000.

References

External links
Official website of Bogdanovich 
Bogdanovich Business Directory 

Cities and towns in Sverdlovsk Oblast